Witchduck Point is the name of the location where suspected witch Grace Sherwood was subjected to trial by water July 10, 1706. It is located within the neighborhood of Witchduck in Virginia Beach, Virginia.

References

History of Virginia
History of Virginia Beach, Virginia
Culture of Virginia Beach, Virginia